A chemical structure determination includes a chemist's specifying the molecular geometry and, when feasible and necessary, the electronic structure of the target molecule or other solid. Molecular geometry refers to the spatial arrangement of atoms in a molecule and the chemical bonds that hold the atoms together, and can be represented using structural formulae and by molecular models; complete electronic structure descriptions include specifying the occupation of a molecule's molecular orbitals. Structure determination can be applied to a range of targets from very simple molecules (e.g., diatomic oxygen or nitrogen), to very complex ones (e.g., such as protein or DNA).

Background
Theories of chemical structure were first developed by August Kekulé, Archibald Scott Couper, and Aleksandr Butlerov, among others, from about 1858.  These theories were first to state that chemical compounds are not a random cluster of atoms and functional groups, but rather had a definite order defined by the valency of the atoms composing the molecule, giving the molecules a three dimensional structure that could be determined or solved.

Concerning chemical structure one has to distinguish between pure connectivity of the atoms within a molecule (chemical constitution), a description of a three-dimensional arrangement (molecular configuration, includes e.g. information on chirality) and the precise determination of bond lengths, angles and torsion angles, i.e. a full representation of the (relative) atomic coordinates.

In determining structures of chemical compounds, one generally aims to obtain, first and minimally, the pattern and degree of bonding between all atoms in the molecule; when possible, one seeks the three dimensional spatial coordinates of the atoms in the molecule (or other solid).

Structural elucidation
The methods by which one can determine the structure of a molecule is called structural elucidation.  These methods include:

 concerning only connectivity of the atoms: spectroscopies such as nuclear magnetic resonance (proton and carbon-13 NMR), various methods of mass spectrometry (to give overall molecular mass, as well as fragment masses).Techniques such as absorption spectroscopy and the vibrational spectroscopies, infrared and Raman, provide, respectively, important supporting information about the numbers and adjacencies of multiple bonds, and about the types of functional groups (whose internal bonding gives vibrational signatures); further inferential studies that give insight into the contributing electronic structure of molecules include cyclic voltammetry and X-ray photoelectron spectroscopy.
 concerning precise metric three-dimensional information: can be obtained for gases by gas electron diffraction and microwave (rotational) spectroscopy (and other rotationally resolved spectroscopy) and for the crystalline solid state by X-ray crystallography  or neutron diffraction. These technique can produce three-dimensional models at atomic-scale resolution, typically to a precision of 0.001 Å for distances and 0.1° for angles (in unusual cases even better). 

Additional sources of information are: When a molecule has an unpaired electron spin in a functional group of its structure, ENDOR and electron-spin resonance spectroscopes may also be performed.  These latter techniques become all the more important when the molecules contain metal atoms, and when the crystals required by crystallography or the specific atom types that are required by NMR are unavailable to exploit in the structure determination. Finally, more specialized methods such as electron microscopy are also applicable in some cases.

See also 
 Structural chemistry
 Chemical structure diagram
 Crystallographic database
 MOGADOC A data base for experimental structures determined in the gas phase
 Pauli exclusion principle
 Chemical graph generator

References

Further reading
 
  

Analytical chemistry